The 2018 BYU Cougars women's soccer team represents BYU during the 2018 NCAA Division I women's soccer season. The Cougars are coached for a 24th consecutive season by Jennifer Rockwood, who was co-coach in 1995 and became the solo head coach in 1996. Before 1995 BYU women's soccer competed as a club team and not as a member of the NCAA. Overall the Cougars have made the NCAA tournament in 18 of the 23 seasons that Rockwood has been the head coach. Joining Rockwood as assistant coaches are Brent Anderson (2nd season) and Steve Magleby (1st season) with volunteer assistants Rachel Jorgensen (5th season) and McKinzie Young 7th season). The Cougars came off of a season were they fourth in the WCC and went 7–8–4, 4–4–1 in the WCC. The Cougars were picked to finish third by the WCC media. The Cougars stunned the conference and went 8–1 to win the WCC Championship and return to the NCAA Playoffs where they lost to TCU in the first round. The Cougars finished the season 13–5–1.

Media

Television & Internet Streaming 
Most BYU women's soccer will have a TV broadcast or internet video stream available. BYUtv and TheW.tv will once again serve as the primary providers. Information on these television broadcasts can be found under each individual match.

Nu Skin BYU Sports Network 

For a fifth consecutive season the BYU Sports Network will air BYU Cougars women's soccer games. Greg Wrubell will provide play-by-play for most games with Jason Shepherd or Robbie Bullough filling-in when Wrubell has football duties. Analysts will rotate. ESPN 960 and BYU Radio will act as the flagship stations for women's soccer.

Affiliates
BYU Radio- Flagship Station Nationwide (KBYU-HD2, KUMT, Dish Network 980, Sirius XM 143, TuneIn radio, and byuradio.org)
ESPN 960- Provo, Utah
ESPN 980 AM and 105.1 FM- Ammon/Idaho Falls/Rexburg, Idaho

Schedule
WCC game (*)
Nu Skin BYU Sports Network/ESPN 960 broadcast (x)
Television Broadcast (y)
Internet Stream (z)

Exhibition: Blue/White Game 
Two 40 minute halves made up the exhibition. Coaches were also free to move players from the Blue to the White and vice versa as it was an inter-squad match.

Exhibition: UCLA
Series History: Series even 2–2–1

x-Exhibition: Alumni
Broadcasters: Greg Wrubell & Jennie Smith (BYU Radio/ESPN 960)

xz-Cal State Fullerton
Series History: BYU leads series 6–0–2
Broadcasters: Ryan Osborne (Big West TV)Greg Wrubell & B.J. Pugmire (BYU Radio/ESPN 960)

xz-Nebraska
Series History: Nebraska leads series 4–2–0
Broadcasters: No commentators (BTN+)Greg Wrubell & Jennie Smith (BYU Radio/ESPN 960)

xz-Texas A&M
Series History: First Meeting
Broadcasters: David Ellis & Jeff Givens (SEC+)Greg Wrubell & Elena Medeiros (BYU Radio/ESPN 960)

xy-Stanford
Series History: Series even 3–3–0
Broadcasters: Spencer Linton, Natalyn Lewis, & Lauren McClain (BYUtv) Greg Wrubell & Paige Barker (BYU Radio/ESPN 960)

xz-Idaho State
Series History: BYU leads 8–2–0
Broadcasters: Robbie Bullough & Paige Barker (TheW.tv/ESPN 960)

xy-Utah
Game Name: Deseret First Duel
Series History: BYU leads series 21–7–2
Broadcasters: Kate Scott & Kelly Gray (P12 MTN)Greg Wrubell & Paige Barker (BYU Radio/ESPN 960)

y-Marquette
This match was originally scheduled for September 14 and 7:00 p.m. and scheduled to be broadcast by the Nu Skin BYU Sports Network. However a field power outage couldn't be resolved in time for the match to take place that evening, so it was rescheduled for Saturday.
Series History: Marquette leads series 2–1–1
Broadcasters: No commentary (MUTV)

xz-Long Beach State
Series History: BYU leads series 7–2–0
Broadcasters: Spencer Linton, Natalyn Lewis, & Lauren McClain (BYUtv.org)Greg Wrubell & Paige Barker (BYU Radio/ESPN 960)

xy-Utah Valley
Game Name: UCCU Cross-Town Clash
Series History: BYU leads series 3–0–0
Broadcasters: Spencer Linton, Natalyn Lewis, & Lauren McClain (BYUtv)Greg Wrubell & Paige Barker (BYU Radio/ESPN 960)

xy-Gonzaga*
Series History: BYU leads series 10–0–0
Broadcasters: Spencer Linton, Carla Haslam, & Lauren McClain (BYUtv)Greg Wrubell & Avery Walker (BYU Radio/ESPN 960)

xz-Portland*
Series History: BYU leads series 8–4–0
Broadcasters: Jason Shepherd & Avery Walker (TheW.tv/BYU Radio (KUMT only)/ESPN 960)

xz-San Diego*
Series History: BYU leads series 7–3–0
Broadcasters: Nick Rice (TheW.tv)Greg Wrubell & Jennie Smith (BYU Radio/ESPN 960)

xz-Pepperdine*
Series History: Pepperdine leads series 5–4–0
Broadcasters: Al Epstein (TheW.tv)Jason Shepherd & Avery Walker (BYU Radio/ESPN 960)

xz-Pacific*
Series History: BYU leads series 8–1–0
Broadcasters: Jeff Dominick (TheW.tv)Greg Wrubell & Elena Medeiros (BYU Radio/ESPN 960)

xz-Saint Mary's* 
Series History: BYU leads series 7–0–1
Broadcasters: (TheW.tv) Greg Wrubell & Elena Medeiros (BYU Radio/ESPN 960)

xy- San Francisco* 
Series History: BYU leads series 6–2–0
Broadcasters: Spencer Linton, Carla Haslam, & Lauren McClain (BYUtv) Greg Wrubell & Avery Walker (BYU Radio/ESPN 960)

xz–Santa Clara*
Series History: Santa Clara leads series 7–1–4
Broadcasters: Robbie Bullough & Elena Medeiros (TheW.tv) Jason Shepherd & Avery Walker (BYU Radio/ESPN 960)

xz-Loyola Marymount*
Series History: BYU leads series 7–1–1
Broadcasters: Ray Ferrari (TheW.tv) Jason Shepherd & Jennie Smith (BYU Radio (KUMT only)/ESPN 960)

xz-TCU
Series History: BYU leads series 8–0–0
Broadcasters: Kyle Crews (HF TV) Jason Shepherd & Avery Walker (BYU Radio (KUMT only)/ESPN 960)

Roster

Rankings

References 

2018 in sports in Utah
2018 West Coast Conference women's soccer season
BYU
2018 team